Alex Usifo (born 16 April 1953) is a Nigerian actor.

Career 
Usifo auditioned at different media houses including Radio Nigeria Lagos, Voice of Nigeria, NTA Ilorin etc. He made it to the top list, but was dropped because of ‘Quota System’. He was unemployed for years. On the invitation of his friend/brother Peter Okun, Alex attended a Deeper Life Crusade, where he desperately asked God for a change in his condition and he got an answer: ‘look inwards’.

His acting career kicked off in 1984 when he played a major role in the tele-movie The Return of the Native. He took lead roles in Natas and ‘Two People. He started attending NTA, Victoria Island to take part in the weekly series At Your Service. He was part of NTA productions: Echoes of Life, and Turning Wheel, between 1984 and 1987.

Recognition came in 1988 when he starred in Zeb Ejiro's soap opera, Ripples. Usifo portrayed Talaab Abass. The show broke ground in television because few soap operas existed. Talaab Abass was a villain. Alex interpreted the character with bulging eyes and a baritone voice.

Usifo made a name for himself long before Nollywood came into existence. He participated in stage plays including Awero. This was staged at the National Theatre, Iganmu. He appeared in Ola Rotimi's Our Husband Has Gone Mad Again! also staged at the National Theatre. He featured in radio and films.

Recognition 
Usifo won awards locally and internationally, including:

 Best Actor - African Collaboration; RLG Ghana Movie Awards 2012
 Best Actor – Ripples; Legends of Nollywood Awards
 AETV London and EHIGLAD Entertainment Presentation
 Lifetime Achievement Award; Nollywood Christian Fellowship 2012
 Excellent Achievement in the Movie Industry; Niger Delta Awards [2009]
 Outstanding Achievement in Nollywood; Bells University Awards
 Award for Excellence in Artistic Creativity; Achievers’ Intl. University and Educational Network
 Peace and Development Award 2013; YELL/Advocacy Magazine & Partnership for Women and Justice
 Distinguished Award for Excellence; Rotract Club of Sagamu
 Inspirational Award; United Nation Council of Churches & Ministerial Fellowship
 Award for Excellence and Exemplary Living; Omega Fire Ministries
 The Snapshots Award; Covenant Christian Centre
 Award of Recognition; Calvary Bible Church
 Bridge Builder Awards; Winners’ Youth Ministry, Badagry
 Award for Leadership Excellence in Nollywood Movies – El Shaddai Ministries Intl. 
 Nollywood Icons Award – Nigerian Film Corporation.

Filmography
 End of the Wicked (1999)
Okoro the Prince
Strong Men at Work
Trumpet of Death
Who am I?
Final Point
The Guilty
Azima
Silent Night
Desperadoes
My Love
Classical Fraud (with Ufuoma Ejenobor)
Dangerous Sisters (with Genevieve Nnaji and Dakore Akande)
Enakhe (2020)

References

External links

Male actors from Edo State
1953 births
21st-century Nigerian male actors
20th-century Nigerian male actors
Living people
Nigerian male film actors
Nigerian radio personalities
Nigerian male television actors
Nigerian film award winners